Rana Faheem Ashraf (born 16 January 1994) is a Pakistani international cricketer who represents the national side and plays first-class cricket for Habib Bank Limited. In August 2018, he was one of thirty-three players to be awarded a central contract for the 2018–19 season by the Pakistan Cricket Board (PCB).

Personal life
Born into a Muslim-Rajput family in Phool Nagar, a town located in Kasur, Punjab, his father Rana Muhammad Ashraf is an influential lawyer.

He has two sisters and seven brothers.

Domestic career
He scored a century on his first-class debut in 2013–14. He was the leading wicket-taker in the 2016–17 Departmental One Day Cup, taking 19 wickets. He was also the leading wicket-taker for Punjab in the 2017 Pakistan Cup, with eight dismissals in four matches.

He was drafted in by Islamabad United from Gold category (earning between US$50,000-US$60,000) in the 2018 Pakistan Super League players draft.  Faheem played an integral part in team's winning the 2018 season. Faheem took 18 wickets and scored runs in crucial moments for his side. He was the leading wicket-taker of the tournament, and won the best bowler of the season award at the end of the season along with a Maroon cap.

In September 2019, he was named in Central Punjab's squad for the 2019–20 Quaid-e-Azam Trophy tournament. In December 2021, he was signed by Islamabad United following the players' draft for the 2022 Pakistan Super League. In July 2022, he was signed by the Galle Gladiators for the third edition of the Lanka Premier League.

In August 2022, he was signed by Hobart Hurricanes for BBL 12.

International career
In March 2017, he was named in Pakistan's One Day International (ODI) squad for their series against the West Indies, although he did not play. In April 2017, he was named in Pakistan's ODI squad for the 2017 ICC Champions Trophy.

In an ICC Champions Trophy warm-up match against Bangladesh, Ashraf scored 64 runs in Pakistan's two-wicket win. He made his ODI debut for Pakistan against Sri Lanka in the Champions Trophy on 12 June 2017, dismissing Dinesh Chandimal for his first ODI wicket.

He made his Twenty20 International (T20I) debut for Pakistan against a World XI in the 2017 Independence Cup on 12 September 2017.

On 27 October 2017, he took a hat-trick for Pakistan in the second T20I match against Sri Lanka at the Sheikh Zayed Cricket Stadium, Abu Dhabi helping team seal a series lead and became the first bowler for Pakistan, and sixth player overall, to take a hat-trick in a T20I.

In April 2018, he was named in Pakistan's Test squad for their tours to Ireland and England in May 2018. He made his Test debut for Pakistan, against Ireland, on 11 May 2018.

In July 2018, he took his first five-wicket haul in ODIs, against Zimbabwe, at the Queens Sports Club in Bulawayo. The following month, he was named the PCB's Emerging Player of the Year.

In April 2019, he was named in Pakistan's squad for the 2019 Cricket World Cup. However, on 20 May 2019, he was dropped from Pakistan's squad, after they announced their final team for the tournament.

In June 2020, he was named in a 29-man squad for Pakistan's tour to England during the COVID-19 pandemic. In July, he was shortlisted in Pakistan's 20-man squad for the Test matches against England.

In January 2021, he was named in Pakistan's Test squad for their series against South Africa. In the first Test, Ashraf scored 64 with the bat.

T20 franchise career
In September 2018, he was named in Paktia's squad in the first edition of the Afghanistan Premier League tournament.

See also
 List of Twenty20 International cricket hat-tricks

References

External links
 

1994 births
Living people
People from Kasur District
Pakistani cricketers
Pakistan Test cricketers
Pakistan One Day International cricketers
Pakistan Twenty20 International cricketers
Faisalabad cricketers
Habib Bank Limited cricketers
St Kitts and Nevis Patriots cricketers
National Bank of Pakistan cricketers
Punjab (Pakistan) cricketers
Islamabad United cricketers
Twenty20 International hat-trick takers
Central Punjab cricketers